Reina Ysabel (A-06) is a roll-on/roll-off cargo ship and logistics support ship of the Spanish Navy purchased secondhand from the shipping company Suardiaz.

 Description 
Reina Ysabel is a roll-on/roll-off cargo ship that is designed to carry cargo that is driven on and off the ship via wheeled vehicles. This can include trailers, trucks, or cars. Its cargo capacity is 110 trailers or 1,404 cars. It has seven decks and a -long ramp at the aft of the ship.

 History 
The ship was laid down on 21 March 2003 at the Hijos de J. Barreras Shipyard in Vigo, Spain, and was launched on 24 September of that year. It joined the fleet of the shipping company Suardiaz under the name Suardiaz Galicia.

At the end of 2020, the Spanish Navy purchased the ship from Suardiaz for a sum of 7.5 million Euros and renamed it Reina Ysabel. The ship returned to its home port at Vigo to undergo the necessary modifications for its new role as a logistics support ship. On 2 June 2021, the ship was commissioned into the Spanish Navy in Cartagena.

In April 2022, Reina Ysabel was sent to Poland with supplies and weapons for Ukraine following the 2022 Russian invasion. In February 2023, the ship cruised to the Canary Islands, moving military material between Tenerife and Gran Canaria.

References 

Ships of the Spanish Navy
Ro-ro ships
2003 ships